Vartex Parsanian (born August 7, 1952) is an Iranian Armenian boxer who was a member of Iran senior national Boxing team participating at the 1974 Asian Games in Tehran, in the 75 kg division.
In Tehran 1974, Parsanian lost on points to Kim from Korea, in the semifinal, and won the bronze medal of the 75 kg boxing division.

References

Living people
1952 births
Iranian people of Armenian descent
Iranian male boxers
Ethnic Armenian sportspeople
Asian Games medalists in boxing
Olympic boxers of Iran
Boxers at the 1972 Summer Olympics
Boxers at the 1974 Asian Games
Asian Games bronze medalists for Iran
Armenian male boxers
Medalists at the 1974 Asian Games
Welterweight boxers
20th-century Iranian people